Las Meninas is a 1656 painting by Diego Velázquez. Las Meninas may also refer to:

 Las Meninas (Picasso), a series of 58 paintings by Pablo Picasso, painted in 1957
 Las Meninas (horse), an Irish Thoroughbred racehorse
 Las Meninas (film), a 2008 Ukrainian film